Needy Streamer Overload is a 2022 denpa-themed adventure visual novel created by Japanese developer Xemono and published by WSS Playground for macOS, Microsoft Windows, and Nintendo Switch. The player takes on the role of a manager for a female livestreamer, making decisions for her so that she can achieve her goal of reaching one million followers within a month. The game was initially titled Needy Girl Overdose, but this was changed in November 2021 in preparation for the western release. The game kept its original title in Japan.

Setting
 is a mentally ill young girl with a needy personality, who has dropped out of school and confined herself at home, living together with the self-insert player protagonist. The protagonist, affectionately called , is tasked with managing her day-to-day life as she increases her follower count.

Gameplay

The player interacts with Ame exclusively through a pastel-themed Windows 95-esque user interface, selecting her daily tasks via desktop icons, monitoring her stats via the Task Manager, and conversing with her through an instant messenger service called JINE. Each day is divided into noon, dusk and evening timeslots, and various actions can take up one or multiple of these timeslots. Ame can only livestream during the evening, as that is the time of day where stream viewers are most active. During Ame's livestreams, the player takes on the role of a content moderator responsible for deleting or promoting viewer comments within the stream's livechat. After streaming or concluding various activities, the player is able to obtain a glimpse of Ame's thoughts and mood via her posts on Tweeter.

Alongside follower count, Ame has three stats which the player will need to monitor, namely stress, affection (towards the player), and mental darkness. Should certain attributes become too high or low, Ame will begin to display adverse effects. Activities that the player can choose for Ame may involve searching for new stream ideas, spending time together, sleeping, or abusing prescription and illicit drugs. Each of these activities affects Ame's stats in differing ways.

At release, there were originally 22 different endings to the game, which are encountered based on the player's choices. Additional endings were added in an October 28, 2022 update coinciding with the game's Nintendo Switch release.

Development
Game development began in June 2020 under the initial title Needy Girl Overdose. The title of the game for its English-language and Chinese-language releases were later changed to Needy Streamer Overload and "主播女孩重度依賴" respectively; the reason for the title change was not disclosed. During the development process, the game was prototyped in Figma, and then built using the Unity engine. The game was initially scheduled for release during Spring 2021; eventually a release date of June 5, 2021 was announced, however was later delayed by the developers, citing the need for additional quality improvements. This seven month delay was later explained to have allowed the further implementation of additional game event scenarios, and a three- to four-fold increase in the number of animations. The game's dialogue has a wordcount of over 140,000 in the original Japanese script.

, who had previously written various literature focused on mental illness, was responsible for the planning and writing of the game, while illustrator  was responsible for the character designs. The game's art direction heavily draws influence from vaporwave aesthetics and retro pixel art from the PC-98 era, along with 1990s-era bishōjo games. There were originally four different female characters with unique personality traits planned during the early stages of development, however it was eventually decided that the final game would only feature a single heroine, combining various personality traits into the one character.

Following the commercial success of the game's initial download-only Windows release, a Nintendo Switch port was announced in May 2022, including a Japan-exclusive physical release fanart book and a CD of the game's soundtrack. The Switch version was released on October 27, 2022, alongside a major update including new endings and text across platforms.

Media
The game's theme song is "Internet Overdose" by producer  and vocalist Kotoko, composed and produced in a denpa song style. The song is available as a playable track in the music rhythm games Muse Dash and Arcaea, as part of their respective collaboration updates. The theme has also charted on the Spotify "Japan Viral 50" chart.

On April 4, 2022, publisher WSS Playground announced that in addition to being sold via online music distribution services, the game's soundtrack will also be released on 12-inch vinyl record format, to be released on June 29, 2022.

A manga adaptation written by Itaru Bonnoki and illustrated by Nata Ōkura, titled Needy Girl Overdose: Run with My Sick, will begin serialization on Akita Shoten's Manga Cross manga website on March 21, 2023.

Reception

Needy Streamer Overload sold over 100,000 copies during its first week of release. As of June 2022, the game has sold over 500,000 copies on Steam. The Nintendo Switch version sold 11,693 copies within its first week of release in Japan, making it the tenth bestselling retail game of the week in the country. It has a rating of "overwhelmingly positive" based on more than 5,800 user reviews.

IGN Japan notes that the game has merit as a work of satire intended at picking apart modern livestreaming culture and toxic relationships, and praises the game's art and presentation, however criticises the limited choices and gimmicks available to express the player character's persona in different ways, arguing that the player is not given the opportunity to become properly aware of any consequences from their interactions with Ame. In addition, the character of Ame is criticised as more of a "male nerd's delusion" of what girls are like, rather than how women realistically behave.

Dengeki Online suggests that despite the gratuitous use of mentally disturbing content, Needy Streamer Overload is a quality piece of work full of expressiveness that can only be delivered through games as an entertainment medium, while also pointing out that players unfamiliar with internet culture may not fully appreciate what the game attempts to portray.

A review from  mentions that while the game has a few rough areas and bugs which detract from the experience, the game still represents a domestic Japanese indie title with a high degree of preciseness put into it, closely satirising the intended audience's internet addiction while at the same time acknowledging how it forms part of their identity.

Another review published by United Daily News in Taiwan compares the game progression experience of Needy Streamer Overload to that of Undertale, in reference to how the player learns more and more about Ame during each subsequent playthrough to unlock all the endings. While acknowledging that that game's themes may be too heavy for some audiences, it claims that the game is a "masterpiece" for players who enjoy the premise of exploring menhera issues and are fans of denpa culture, and also praised the official Chinese language localisation of the game, especially in regards to its use of Chinese internet memes, claiming that they accurately express the mood of the original Japanese script while still maintaining some degree of familiarity among the audience.

 provides a comparatively more critical review of the game, claiming that it is a disturbing and morally contentious title which uses ambiguity to hide the player's evident hatred towards Ame, as observable through the player's ability to torment her, and how the game rewards players who choose to ignore repercussions on Ame's mental health when allowing her to overdose on drugs and slice her wrists in order to progress through the game and unlock new scenarios to explore. The review also criticises what it views as the game's lack of sagacity when utilising shock value, suggesting that such usage moves beyond parodic intent.

South Korean gaming magazine  praised the game's chiptune soundtrack and overall atmosphere, however criticises the game's short length and the repetitive nature of progressing multiple playthroughs to unlock each ending, claiming that unlike other "raising simulators" such as Princess Maker which feel rewarding as the game goes on, Needy Streamer Overload may not provide the player with as much of a sense of accomplishment, despite being a game with a similar premise.

Needy Streamer Overload won the "Most Stream-friendly Game" and "Best New Characters" awards at the 2022  in Japan. The game also was one of two runner-up titles receiving honourable mention for the Game Designers Award at the 2022 Japan Game Awards.

Notes

References

External links
NEEDY STREAMER OVERLOAD on Steam

2022 video games
2023 manga
Adventure games
Akita Shoten manga
Business simulation games
Fiction about social media
MacOS games
Mass media about Internet culture
Nintendo Switch games
Self-harm in fiction
Social simulation video games
Video games about mental health
Video games about suicide
Video games about virtual reality
Video games developed in Japan
Video games featuring female protagonists
Video games set in Tokyo
Video games with alternate endings
Visual novels
Windows games